Marie-Catherine de Senecey, née de La Rochefoucauld-Randan (1588–1677) was a French courtier. She served as Première dame d'honneur to the queen of France, Anne of Austria, from 1626 until 1638, and royal governess to king Louis XIV of France and his brother from 1643 until 1646.

Life
Marie-Catherine de Senecey was the daughter of Jean-Louis de La Rochefoucauld, and married to Henri de Bauffremont, marquis de Senecey (1577–1622), in 1607. In 1626, she was appointed Dame d'atour to queen Anne, and when Charlotte de Lannoy died later that year, she was promoted to succeed her as Première dame d'honneur, and was herself succeeded as Dame d'atour by Madeleine du Fargis. She was well liked by queen Anne, and loyal to the queen before Cardinal Richelieu. 

In 1638, the king relieved her from her office and banished her from court for being in opposition to Cardinal Richelieu, and for having encouraged Louise de La Fayette to enter a convent.      

When Anne became regent in 1643, she recalled Marie-Catherine de Senecey to court and appointed her to replace Françoise de Lansac as royal governess and her daughter Marie-Claire de Fleix to replace Catherine de Brassac as Première dame d'honneur. 

In March 1661, Louis XIV created the Duchy of Randan and made her the first duchess de Randan as a recognition of her services.

References 

 Harry Ashton, Madame de La Fayette: sa vie et ses œuvres
 Musée national de Versailles,   Notice historique des peintures et des sculptures du palais de Versailles
 Kleinman, Ruth: Anne of Austria. Queen of France. . Ohio State University Press (1985)

1588 births
1677 deaths
17th-century French people 
17th-century French women 
16th-century French people 
16th-century French women 
French ladies-in-waiting
Governesses to the Children of France
Court of Louis XIV
Court of Louis XIII
Household of Anne of Austria